Harriet and the Piper is a 1920 American drama film directed by Bertram Bracken and written by Monte M. Katterjohn. It is based on the 1920 novel Harriet and the Piper by Kathleen Norris. The film stars Anita Stewart, Ward Crane, Charles Richman, Myrtle Stedman, Margaret Landis, and Byron Munson. The film was released on September 13, 1920, by First National Exhibitors' Circuit.

Cast       
Anita Stewart as Harriet Field
Ward Crane as Royal Blondin
Charles Richman as Richard Carter
Myrtle Stedman as Isabelle Carter
Margaret Landis as Nina Carter
Byron Munson as Ward Carter
Loyola O'Connor as Madame Carter
Irving Cummings as Anthony Pope
Barbara La Marr as Tam O'Shanter Girl

References

External links
 
 

1920 films
1920s English-language films
Silent American drama films
1920 drama films
First National Pictures films
American silent feature films
American black-and-white films
Films directed by Bertram Bracken
1920s American films